Uniontown Area School District is a highly fragmented midsized, rural public school district located in Fayette County, Pennsylvania.  It serves the city of Uniontown and the boroughs of Ohiopyle, and Markleysburg. It also serves Wharton, Henry Clay, Menallen, Franklin, and Stewart townships. The district encompasses approximately 250 square miles. Based on 2000 federal census data, the district serves a resident population of 26,925. In 2009, the district residents’ per capita income was $14,621, while the median family income was $33,750. In the Commonwealth, the median family income was 
$49,501 and the United States median family income was $49,445, in 2010.

Schools

Extracurriculars
The district offers a variety of clubs, activities and sports.

References

External links
 Uniontown Area School District website
 Penna. Interscholastic Athletic Assn.

Uniontown, Pennsylvania
School districts in Fayette County, Pennsylvania
Education in Pittsburgh area